Wright's Opera House, sometimes referred to as Wright's Hall, was constructed in 1888 and is located at 472 Main Street in Ouray, Colorado. For many years after the mining bust and subsequent end of performances it was used as a multi-use building for presentations and community events. Around the year 2000 it was converted into a movie theater which operated until late 2006. Currently it serves as a movie house and performing arts and special events rental venue.

This structure is a contributing property to the Ouray Historic District on the National Register of Historic Places.

References

External links 
Ouray Historical Society

Buildings and structures in Ouray County, Colorado
Historic district contributing properties in Colorado
Italianate architecture in Colorado
Opera houses in Colorado
Theatres in Colorado